Luca Schwarzbauer (born 23 October 1996) is a German cross-country mountain biker.

Major results
2014
 1st  Cross-country, National Junior Championships
 2nd  Cross-country, UEC European Junior Championships
 3rd  Cross-country, UCI World Junior Championships
2020
 2nd Marathon, National Championships
2021
 1st  Marathon, National Championships
 3rd  Team relay, UCI World Championships
2022
 1st  Short track, National Championships
 UCI XCC World Cup
1st Nové Město
2023
 Shimano Super Cup Massi
2nd Banyoles

References

External links

German male cyclists
Cross-country mountain bikers
1996 births
Living people
German mountain bikers